Nové Strašecí is a town in Rakovník District in the Central Bohemian Region of the Czech Republic. It has about 5,600 inhabitants.

Administrative parts

The village of Pecínov is an administrative part of Nové Strašecí.

Geography
It lies in the geomorphological mesoregion of Džbán.

History
The first written mention of Strašecí is from the period 1334–1343. Shortly after the village was promoted to a market town. It was a part of the Křivoklát estate, owned by the royal chamber. During the 15th century, Strašecí lost its privileges, but in 1503, it was promoted to a town by King Vladislaus II. In 1553, the town was destroyed by large fire and entirely rebuilt.

Pecínov was first mentioned in 1556. The original part of the settlement disappeared after the World War II due to fire clay mining and remained only the upper part of the settlement, which was established in the 1830s.

Demographics

Transport
The town is located on a railway line leading from Prague to Kladno and Rakovník. There is a train station which is served by regional trains.

The D6 motorway runs next to the town.

Notable people
Viktor Oliva (1861–1928), painter and illustrator

Twin towns – sister cities

Nové Strašecí is twinned with:
 Welden, Germany

References

External links

Cities and towns in the Czech Republic
Populated places in Rakovník District